Empress Zhen may refer to:

 Empress Zhen (Cao Fang) (甄皇后, personal name unknown) (died 251), wife of Cao Fang of Cao Wei
 Lady Zhen, wife of Cao Pi
 Empress Zhen (Liao dynasty) (died 951), wife of Emperor Shizong of Liao
 Empress Dowager Ci'an (1837–1881), also known as Empress Zhen (貞皇后), married to Xianfeng Emperor of Qing Dynasty

See also
 Zhen (disambiguation)

Zhen